Uncaria is a genus of flowering plants in the family Rubiaceae. It has about 40 species. Their distribution is pantropical, with most species native to tropical Asia, three from Africa and the Mediterranean and two from the neotropics. They are known colloquially as gambier, cat's claw or uña de gato. The latter two names are shared with several other plants. The type species for the genus is Uncaria guianensis.

The South American U. tomentosa is called Uña de Gato. Uncaria sinensis is common in China.

Uncaria was named in 1789 by Johann von Schreber in his Genera Plantarum edition 8[a] (not to be confused with books of the same title by Linnaeus, Jussieu, and others). The genus name is derived from the Latin word uncus, meaning "a hook". It refers to the hooks, formed from reduced branches, that Uncaria vines use to cling to other vegetation.

Uncaria is a member of the tribe Naucleeae, but its position within that tribe remains unresolved.

Description
Woody lianas; climbing by hooks formed from reduced, modified branches. Stipules entire or bifid. Inflorescences are compact heads at the ends of horizontal, very reduced branches. Corolla lobes without appendages. Seeds with a long wing at each end, the lower wing deeply bifid.

Species
The following species list may be incomplete or contain synonyms.

Uses
Diplomat Edmund Roberts noted that, upon his visit to China in the 1830s, Chinese were using U. gambir for tanning, and noted that the U. gambir made "leather porous and rotten." He also noted that Chinese would chew it with areca nut. The plant extract contains some 150 identified phytochemicals, including catechins, proanthocyanins, and chalcone-flavan-3-ol dimers, called gambiriins. Cat's claw (U. tomentosa) and the Chinese Uncaria species are used in traditional medicine, although there is no high-quality clinical evidence they have any medicinal properties.

Adverse effects
Although cat's claw appears to be safe for human use below 350 milligrams per day over 6 weeks, its adverse effects may include nausea, diarrhea, upset stomach, and an increased risk of bleeding if used with an anticoagulant drug.

References

External links

Germplasm Resources Information Network: Uncaria
 Search Uncaria, Royal Botanic Gardens, KewScience

 
Rubiaceae genera
Medicinal plants
Pantropical flora